Elvis Tsui Kam-kong (born October 12, 1961) is a Hong Kong actor and artist.

Tsui is primarily known for his roles in erotic films and martial arts films, where he's more often cast as villains. Some of the famous characters he has portrayed repeatedly include Oboi, Lu Zhishen, Sorcerer Aquala and An Lushan.

Biography
Tsui graduated from the Guangzhou Academy of Fine Arts with a degree in arts. He was also a student of the artist Guan Shanyue. In 1982, Tsui went to Hong Kong to expand his career as an artist, photographer, model and nightclub singer.

In 1987, Tsui met film director Johnny Mak, who invited him to act in Long Arm of the Law II. Tsui was often cast as the antagonist or villain in most of the films and television series he acted in, because of his fierce looks. Tsui has also acted in Hong Kong erotic films (Category III), such as the Sex and Zen series and Viva Erotica (1996), which earned him a Best Supporting Actor nomination at the 16th Hong Kong Film Awards. Tsui has ventured into the Chinese mainland film industry in recent times and currently works with film director Wong Jing.

Filmography

Film

TV dramas

Awards and nominations

References

External links

HKMDB
LoveHKfilm
HK Cinemagic

1961 births
Living people
Manchu male actors
Hong Kong people of Manchu descent
Hong Kong Buddhists
People from Mudanjiang
Male actors from Heilongjiang
Hong Kong male television actors
Hong Kong male film actors
20th-century Hong Kong male actors
21st-century Hong Kong male actors
Nightclub performers
Chinese male film actors
Chinese male television actors
20th-century Chinese male actors
21st-century Chinese male actors